Teofilo Aloisio Mikaele Paulo (born 6 November 1987) is a New Zealand-born Samoan rugby union player. He specialises as a lock forward. He plays for Manawatu Turbos in the NPC.

Career
Paulo had a brief stint with Ulster in 2009, for whom he made two Celtic League appearances. In 2010 he was named as a member of the Blues wider training squad, however an injury to Ali Williams meant he was called into the full squad. He was a full squad member since 2011. Paulo made his provincial debut for North Harbour in 2011.

In January 2013 he joined the Welsh team Cardiff Blues, making 75 appearances over two seasons. From 2015 to 2017 he played for Benetton Treviso. On 5 June 2017 it was announced he had signed for English Premiership side London Irish from the following season. He made 30 appearances for the team before leaving in 2019. He rejoined the Cardiff Blues in 2019 for a one-year contract, leaving at the end of the season. He then returned to New Zealand where he played for the Manawatu Turbos. He was not retained for the 2021 season, moving to Wellington team Avalon.

On 23 August 2019, he was named in Samoa's 34-man training squad for the 2019 Rugby World Cup, before being named in the final 31 on 31 August.

References

External links

1987 births
New Zealand rugby union players
Rugby union locks
Blues (Super Rugby) players
North Harbour rugby union players
Ulster Rugby players
Cardiff Rugby players
London Irish players
Samoa international rugby union players
Living people
Expatriate rugby union players in Wales
Expatriate rugby union players in Northern Ireland
Rugby union players from Wellington City
New Zealand sportspeople of Samoan descent
New Zealand expatriate sportspeople in Wales
New Zealand expatriate sportspeople in Northern Ireland
New Zealand expatriate rugby union players
New Zealand expatriate sportspeople in Italy
New Zealand expatriate sportspeople in England
Expatriate rugby union players in Italy
Expatriate rugby union players in England
Samoan expatriate rugby union players
Samoan expatriate sportspeople in Italy
Samoan expatriate sportspeople in Northern Ireland
Samoan expatriate sportspeople in Wales
Samoan expatriate sportspeople in England